The Last Colony is a science fiction novel by American writer John Scalzi, the third set in his Old Man's War universe. It was nominated for a 2008 Hugo Award in the Best Novel category.

Plot synopsis
John Perry and Jane Sagan, the former Ghost Brigade clone of Perry's dead wife, are offered positions as leaders for the new colony of Roanoke, which will comprise human settlers from the first ten established human colonies. After deliberating, they decide to accept and go with Zoe to the new colony. In tow are Zoe's Obin protectors, named Hickory and Dickory, who view her with almost religious awe due to her father's success in giving the Obin consciousness.

Upon arriving, the colonists quickly realize they are not at Roanoke. They are approached by a member of the Special Forces of the CDF, adapted to live in space, who had attached himself to the exterior of their craft. He informs them they have no option but to land and begin the colony anyway. The ship has been irreparably damaged to prevent the craft from leaving orbit, and all the colonists are considered quarantined from the rest of the Colonial Union. The Conclave (a group that wants to stop humanity's expansion) was aware of the original position of Roanoke, and therefore was waiting to annihilate them. He further tells them that to isolate them fully, they are forbidden from using any advanced technology. This is offset by the presence of the Mennonites, an Amish-like group of colonists who are familiar with the large amount of basic machinery that the CDF had given the colonists.

The colony proceeds with surprisingly little initial difficulty. Several colonists are killed by stone-age-level werewolf-like creatures who view them as potential prey, but otherwise begin to settle into the colony. After a certain length of time, they are again visited by Special Forces, who inform them that the plan has partially succeeded, and the initial restrictions on technology have been lifted. The Union attempted to destabilize the Conclave by making them appear incompetent, due to their inability to find a single colony despite a year's worth of searching.

After a brief interlude when their location is leaked to the Conclave, they are visited by the Conclave fleet, consisting of a single ship from every member race of the Conclave. The Conclave leader, General Gau, begs John to either give up the colony or secede from the Union and join the Conclave. John refuses, and asks General Gau to surrender. Baffled, the General tells John to make his peace, and orders the Conclave fleet to open fire. Almost immediately, the entire fleet is annihilated. Special Forces members, during the prior year, had methodically tracked down every ship in the Conclave fleet and attached an antimatter bomb to the hull. The officer who accompanied the erstwhile Roanoke colonists then waited for every Conclave ship to arrive before detonating the explosives, save the leader's craft. This shatters the Conclave into multiple factions, several of which swear vengeance on the Union. Jane staves off an attempted attack from one faction, remotely controlling the colony's defense lasers, although some people are killed.

After the attack, John is arrested for almost ruining the plan to destroy the enemy fleet by asking General Gau to surrender. He is eventually released, and after speaking with Special Forces again, returns to New-Roanoke. He realizes that New-Roanoke is a sacrificial pawn. If New-Roanoke is destroyed, enlistment in the CDF will spike using the destruction of the colony as a rally cry, allowing for a more aggressive campaign against the other alien races. This however will cause humanity's eventual extinction through a war of attrition.

John abdicates the leadership of New-Roanoke and joins the Conclave, after being awarded a ship by them as his sovereign domain, with help from the Obin. Together with the other members of the Conclave, he visits (forbidden, isolated) Earth to reveal what has been occurring in the rest of the universe and to update them on the Conclave's level of technology.

The Colonial Union is thrown into disarray, with enlistment plummeting and potential colonists demurring, but the end of the book suggests that bringing Earth into the Union properly will allow for more diplomatic solutions and cooperation between species.

References

External links
 John Scalzi's blog
 About The Last Colony and John Scalzi at the publisher's official website

American science fiction novels
2007 American novels
Sequel novels
Old Man's War
2007 science fiction novels
Tor Books books